Bradyville is an unincorporated community in Lincoln County, in the U.S. state of West Virginia.

History
Bradyville was laid out in 1903 by Joseph Brady, and named for him. A post office called Bradyville was established in 1906, and remained in operation until 1934.

References

Unincorporated communities in Lincoln County, West Virginia
Unincorporated communities in West Virginia